Dr. Lankapalli Bullayya College Or Dr. L. Bullayya College Or Dr. L.B.College Or LBC Is An Affiliated College of Andhra University Established In 1973 Named In Honour Of Dr. Lankapalli Bullayya Who Served As A Vice-Chancellor Of Andhra University. The College Campus Is located In Resapuvanipalem, Visakhapatnam, Andhra Pradesh. This College Is Awarded ‘A’ grade by NAAC.

History
Academicians, bureaucrats and businessmen of Visakhapatnam formed into a not-for-profit education society called "The Society For Collegiate Education" with K. Jayabharat Reddy as President, Prof K.V. Sivayya as Secretary, Dr. M. Gopala Krishna Reddy as Treasurer, and started this college initially as a College of Commerce offering B.Com.

A wide variety of courses were added gradually and currently the College offers both the undergraduate as well as postgraduate courses in the Faculties of Commerce, Management, Arts and Sciences. In addition to these courses, College is also granted the status of Research Centre in some departments by Andhra University allowing students to pursue their M. Phil and Doctoral programmes.

Society for Collegiate Education has also started a Junior College in 1979 and a College of Engineering for Women in 2010.

Campus Location & Facilities
Campus is located in the heart of the city in Resapuvanipalem area behind Swarna Bharathi Indoor Stadium adjacent to Tech-Mahindra campus on the road Which Is Now Called As The "Bullayya College Road" in Visakhapatnam. 

Campus is built on a 10-acre plot with several multi-storied buildings to accommodate class rooms, seminar halls, laboratories, offices, canteen and other amenities. 

Campus Hosts Several Blocks With Each Block, Dedicated For A Department.Each Block Hosts A Minimum Of 2-3 Floors With Several Rooms In It. The Largest Block Is Block Number 9, Which Is An Undergraduate Block For Science.

Campus Has A Large And Spacious Cricket Ground With 2 More Stadiums, One Being For Basketball And The One Being For Physical Outdoor Sportings.LBC Has A Large And Fully Furnished GYM Which Can Be Used Both, By Girls And Boys At Different Timings. The Classrooms Are Large, Spacious And Open. 

Campus Also Has An Indoor Sports Facility For Sports Such As Table Tennis, Etc. Students take part in games & sports at Inter-University, Intra-University, District, State, National and International levels and have consistently secured medals And Bagged Various Trophies For The Institution.

Campus Also Hosts 5 Units Of NCC And 2 Units Of NSS.

Institutions
Common Campus hosts the following institutions: 

Dr. Lankapalli Bullayya Junior College
Affiliated to the Board of Intermediate Education, Government of Andhra Pradesh
Offers +2 courses (Intermediate) in Sciences and Arts groups (MPC, BiPC, CEC, MEC)
Dr. Lankapalli Bullayya College
Affiliated to Andhra University
UG Commerce & Management division: B.Com, B.B.A
 UG Arts & Science division: B.A., B.Sc
PG Arts & Science division: M.A., M.Sc, MHRM
Affiliated to Andhra University & approved by AICTE
PG Computing & Management division: M.C.A & M.B.A
Dr. Lankapalli Bullayya College of Engineering (Both Men And Women) 
Affiliated to Andhra University & approved by AICTE
Offers B.E.And BTech in Computer Science Engg, Electronics& Communication Engg, Electrical& Electronics Engg, Civil Engg, Etc
Study Center of Indira Gandhi National Open University (IGNOU).

Faculty
President:

Prof'K.C.REDDY

SECRETARY:

Dr G'MADHUKUMAR

DIRECTOR

SATYANARAYAN

PRINCIPAL

CHAKRAVARTHY

PHYSICAL DIRECTOR

POLIREDDY

LIBRARIAN

SATYANARAYANA REDDYPLACEMENT'''SRIDHAR''.

References

External links
 

Universities and colleges in Visakhapatnam
Colleges in Andhra Pradesh
Colleges affiliated to Andhra University
Engineering colleges in Andhra Pradesh
Educational institutions established in 1973
1973 establishments in Andhra Pradesh